Linlithgow is a constituency of the Scottish Parliament (Holyrood) covering part of the council area of West Lothian. It elects one Member of the Scottish Parliament (MSP) by the plurality (first past the post) method of election. It is also one of nine constituencies in the Lothian electoral region, which elects seven additional members, in addition to the nine constituency MSPs, to produce a form of proportional representation for the region as a whole.

The seat has been held by Fiona Hyslop of the Scottish National Party since the 2011 Scottish Parliament election.

Electoral region 

The other eight constituencies of the Lothian region are Almond Valley, Edinburgh Central, Edinburgh Eastern, Edinburgh Northern and Leith, Edinburgh Pentlands, Edinburgh Southern, Edinburgh Western and Midlothian North and Musselburgh

The region includes all of the City of Edinburgh council area, parts of the East Lothian council area, parts of the Midlothian council area and all of the West Lothian council area.

Constituency boundaries and council area 

The West Lothian council area is represented by two constituencies in the Scottish Parliament, these are Almond Valley and Linlithgow.

The Linlithgow constituency was created at the same time as the Scottish Parliament, in 1999, with the name and boundaries of an  existing Westminster constituency. In 2005, however, Scottish Westminster (House of Commons) constituencies were mostly replaced with new constituencies.

The electoral wards used in this seat are:

In full: Armadale and Blackridge, Bathgate, Broxburn, Uphall and Winchburgh and Linlithgow
In part: Whitburn and Blackburn (shared with Almond Valley)

As of 2019, Linlithgow's population (95,663) was the highest among the 70 Holyrood mainland constituencies, almost one-third greater than those at the bottom of the list, the lowest being Argyll and Bute which had barely 60,000 within its boundaries.

Member of the Scottish Parliament

Election results

2020s

2010s

2000s

1990s

Footnotes

External links

Constituencies of the Scottish Parliament
1999 establishments in Scotland
Constituencies established in 1999
Linlithgow
Scottish Parliament constituencies and regions 1999–2011
Scottish Parliament constituencies and regions from 2011
Politics of West Lothian
Broxburn, West Lothian
Bathgate
Armadale, West Lothian
Whitburn, West Lothian